Poppy Rush (born 10 October 1991) is a British television actress.

Early life
Poppy Rush was born 10 October 1991. She is the daughter of actress Debbie Rush and sister of actor William Rush.

Career
In 2016, Rush appeared in EastEnders as Sophie Dodd.

She has also performed as the vocalist with family band The Sticks.

Filmography

References

External links

1991 births
Living people
English television actresses
21st-century English actresses